The Director of the Metropolitan Museum of Art is the director of the museum. The Metropolitan Museum of Art of New York City, colloquially "the Met", is the largest art museum in the United States. With 6,953,927 visitors to its three locations in 2018, it was the third most visited art museum in the world. Its permanent collection contains over two million works, divided among seventeen curatorial departments. The director, currently Max Hollein, is responsible for acting as a "curator, lawyer and diplomat", according to The Wall Street Journal. They produce around 40 exhibits at the museum a year, manage the museums' approximately 2,200 employees, and oversee the collection and curatorial departments.

The Director currently reports to Daniel H. Weiss, President and CEO of the Museum. The director typically has had a large degree of autonomy in operation, with Philippe de Montebello refusing to report to then president and CEO William Macomber in 1977. It has generally been the highest-ranking official in the museum's leadership, with the director serving as president. On June 13, 2017, the Met announced the reestablishment of a separate museum president, higher than the director.

Past directors have historically been prominent figures in the art world. Past directors include: United States consul at Larnaca in Cyprus and Medal of Honor recipient Luigi Palma di Cesnola, Director of the Victoria and Albert Museum Sir Caspar Purdon Clarke, secretary of the Art Commission of Boston and director of the Boston Museum of Fine Arts Edward Robinson, Parks Commissioner of New York City Thomas Hoving, and director of the Fine Arts Museums of San Francisco Max Hollein.

List

See also 

 List of presidents of the Metropolitan Museum of Art

References